Mehdi Taouil (born 20 May 1983) is a football player who plays as an attacking midfielder, most recently for Azerbaijan Premier League side AZAL. Born in France, he represented Morocco at international level.

Personal
Taouil was born in Villeneuve-Saint-Georges, Île-de-France to a Moroccan father and an Algerian mother.

Club career
During the early stages of his career he played for Nancy and 1. FC Nürnberg but was limited to only infrequent games.

Montpellier
Taouil played for Montpellier in Ligue 2, joining the club on a two-year contract in June 2005, before being released at the end of the 2006/07 season. During his time there he made 48 league appearances scoring three goals.

Kilmarnock
He then signed a one-year deal at Scottish side Kilmarnock in October 2007. On his Kilmarnock debut he was warmly greeted by the fans in a 1–0 loss to Motherwell and was voted as Kilmarnock's Man of the Match. He scored his first goal in the game against Hibernian on 26 December 2007 at Rugby Park, which ended in a 2–1 victory for the Ayrshire side.

Taouil was linked with a transfer to SPL rivals Hearts, but in July 2008 he signed a three-year deal with Kilmarnock. Following the release of Gary Wales, Taouil was given the number 10 shirt for the new season.

In all he made 118 appearances in all competitions scoring 7 goals for Kilmarnock.

Hearts
Despite turning Hearts down in 2008 they again made approaches to sign him when he became a free agent in the summer of 2011 after his three-year contract with Kilmarnock came to an end.

On Tuesday 14 June 2011, Taouil signed for Hearts on a three-year contract. He opted to sign for the Gorgie outfit despite interest from the continent and team up with his former Kilmarnock boss Jim Jefferies. Making his debut against Rangers at Ibrox on 23 July. He scored his first goal for the club on 3 December, with a consolation goal in their 2–1 defeat to St Johnstone. He played as a substitute when Hearts won the 2012 Scottish Cup Final.

Taouil left Hearts in May 2013.

Sivasspor
Mehdi Taouil signed a contract with Turkish Süper Lig side Sivasspor for the 2013/14 season.

AZAL
On 16 February 2017, Taouil signed for Azerbaijan Premier League side AZAL until the end of the 2016–17 season.

International career
Taouil was part of the Moroccan national football team at the 2004 Summer Olympics. Taouil played in all three games as the team exited in the first round, finishing third in Group D behind Iraq and Costa Rica.

Career statistics

Club

References

External links
 
 
 
 
 

1983 births
Living people
Sportspeople from Villeneuve-Saint-Georges
Association football midfielders
French footballers
Moroccan footballers
Morocco international footballers
French sportspeople of Moroccan descent
French sportspeople of Algerian descent
Moroccan expatriate footballers
French expatriate footballers
Expatriate footballers in Germany
Expatriate footballers in Scotland
Expatriate footballers in Turkey
Expatriate footballers in Azerbaijan
AS Nancy Lorraine players
1. FC Nürnberg players
Montpellier HSC players
Kilmarnock F.C. players
Heart of Midlothian F.C. players
Sivasspor footballers
Ligue 1 players
Ligue 2 players
Scottish Premier League players
Süper Lig players
Olympic footballers of Morocco
Footballers at the 2004 Summer Olympics
Bundesliga players
Moroccan people of Algerian descent
Footballers from Val-de-Marne
Moroccan expatriate sportspeople in Turkey
Moroccan expatriate sportspeople in Germany
Moroccan expatriate sportspeople in Scotland
Moroccan expatriate sportspeople in Azerbaijan
French expatriate sportspeople in Turkey
French expatriate sportspeople in Germany
French expatriate sportspeople in Scotland
French expatriate sportspeople in Azerbaijan